Marece Benjamin Richards (born September 2, 1983), better known by his stage name Rich Boy, is an American rapper from Mobile, Alabama. He is best known for the hit single "Throw Some D's" (featuring Polow da Don) released in August 2006. It was the lead single for his eponymous debut album, released a year later in March under Polow da Don's Zone 4 and Interscope Records.

In 2009, one of his follow-up singles "Drop" became popular online through remixes and freestyles from then-upcoming internet rappers, including Childish Gambino, Kid Cudi, and Earl Sweatshirt.

Early life and education
Richards is from Alabama. He was studying mechanical engineering at Tuskegee University, but he dropped out to concentrate on pursuing a rap career.

Career 
Rich Boy signed a contract with Zone 4 through Interscope Records and started to work on his debut album. In the meantime, he appeared on one of Ludacris' Disturbing tha Peace compilations and on a few mixtapes, such as Comeback Season by Canadian rapper Drake and Da Bottom, Vol. 5 by DJ Ideal and Jermaine Dupri.

On March 13, 2007, Rich Boy released his self-titled debut album, with the singles "Throw Some D's," "Boy Looka Here," "Good Things", and "Let's Get This Paper". "Throw Some D's" reached #6 on the Billboard Hot 100, #3 on the Hot R&B/Hip-Hop Songs, and #2 on the Hot Rap Tracks chart. "Boy Looka Here" and "Good Things" both peaked around #50 on the R&B chart. In 2009 he released a single, "Top of the World", which was part of the album Music Inspired by More Than a Game.

Rich Boy's second album was intended in 2010 to be titled Resurrected in Diamonds and was slated for a 2013 release. The intended first single released off the album was "Drop" which had been released in the beginning of early 2009. Another track "She Luvs Me (She Luvs Mi Knot)" featuring Polow da Don was released on June 21, 2010. Both Dr. Dre and Polow da Don were confirmed contributors or producers for the album.

On March 18, 2013, Rich Boy released the mixtape Back to Class in promotion of his second studio album, Break the Pot. On January 14, 2013, the title track was released as a single in promotion of the album, featuring Hemi. On February 25, 2013, it was announced that Break the Pot would be released on April 9, 2013, and would feature guest appearances from Maino, Mista Raja, Bobby V, Doe B, Playboi Lo and Smash. On March 17, the music video for "Break the Pot" premiered on MTV Jams. Break the Pot was released on April 9, 2013, and included the single "Pimp On", which featured Doe B, Playboi Lo and Smash.

Discography

Albums

Studio albums

Mixtapes

Singles

Awards and nominations

BET Hip Hop Awards
2007: Rookie Of the Year [win]

References

External links
 Official FaceBook

1983 births
Living people
African-American male rappers
Musicians from Mobile, Alabama
Place of birth missing (living people)
Rappers from Alabama
Southern hip hop musicians
Tuskegee University alumni
21st-century American rappers
21st-century American male musicians
21st-century African-American musicians
20th-century African-American people